The chilihueque or hueque was a South American camelid variety or species that existed in central and south-central Chile in Pre-Hispanic and colonial times. There are two main hypotheses on their status among South American camelids: the first one suggests that they are locally domesticated guanacos and the second that they are a variety of llamas brought from the north into south-central Chile. The alpaca has also been suggested as a possible identity. In a 2016 mitochondrial DNA study it is concluded that the chilihueque from Mocha Island could derive from the wild guanaco populations of southern Chile.

According to Jesuit priest and scientist Juan Ignacio Molina, the Dutch captain Joris van Spilbergen observed the use of chilihueques by native Mapuches of Mocha Island as plough animals in 1614.

Chilihueque populations declined towards extinction in the 16th and 17th century, being replaced by European livestock. The causes of its extinction are not clear but it is known that the introduction of sheep caused some competition among both domestic species. Anecdotal evidence of the mid-17th century show that both species coexisted but suggests that there were many more sheep than chilihueqes. The decline of chilihueques reached a point in the late 18th century when, according to Tomás Guevara, only the Mapuche from Mariquina and Huequén next to Angol raised the animal.

Chilihueques were used by the Mapuche in ritual slaughter as attested by various 16th-century Spanish records. White chilihueques were preferred and often reserved for dignitaries. Chilihueques were also the main bride price used among Mapuches.

References

Camelids
Animal hair products
Livestock
Mammals of the Andes
Mammals of Chile
Animal breeds originating in Chile
Extinct mammals of South America
Mammal extinctions since 1500
Mapuche